A list of animated feature films first released in 2010.

Highest-grossing films
The top ten animated films by worldwide gross in 2010 were:

Toy Story 3 became the first animated film to reach over $1 billion.

See also
 List of animated television series of 2010

References

2010
2010-related lists

zh:日本動畫列表 (2010年)